The 44th Daytime Emmy Awards, presented by the National Academy of Television Arts and Sciences (NATAS), "recognizes outstanding achievement in all fields of daytime television production and are presented to individuals and programs broadcast from 2:00 a.m. to 6:00 p.m. during the 2016 calendar year". The ceremony took place on April 30, 2017  at the Pasadena Civic Auditorium, in Pasadena, California, and began at 5:00 p.m. PST / 8:00 p.m. EST.  The ceremony, livestreamed in the United States by Facebook Live and Periscope Producer, was executively produced by Michael Levitt, David Parks, and the Senior Vice President of the Daytime Emmy Awards, David Michaels. Actors and television hosts Mario Lopez and Sheryl Underwood hosted the ceremony for the first time.

In related events, the Academy held its  44th Daytime Creative Arts Emmy Awards ceremony also at the Pasadena Civic Auditorium on April 28, 2017. On January 26, 2017,  the Lifetime Achievement Award was presented to Mary Hart. Soap Opera Digest reported that former All My Children star Susan Lucci would make an appearance at the ceremony, as part of a segment paying tribute to the serial's creator, Agnes Nixon.

Category and rule changes
The National Academy of Television Arts and Sciences announced and implemented some category and rule changes for the 44th Daytime Emmy Awards:

 For the Blue Ribbon Final round of judging, the pre-nominees of the six Drama performer categories can create a reel of scenes/appearances that have aired during the 2016 calendar year, that is up to four episodes and reaches a length of 20 minutes long. This is a change from last year, where performers were only to submit a 20-minute reel containing just two episodes.
In the categories of (Outstanding Drama Series Directing Team and Outstanding Drama Series Writing Team, other than one sole episode, the series may now select 2 episodes from the 2016 Calendar year to submit for evaluation.
 Talk Shows categories (Outstanding Talk Show/Entertainment and Outstanding Talk Show/Informative)  can now submit any two episodes from the 2016 calendar year, rather than from one single episode as had been done for several previous years.

Winners and nominees

The nominees for the 44th Daytime Emmy Awards were announced on March 22, 2017, during an episode of CBS's daytime talk show The Talk. The Young and the Restless  led all nominees with 25 nominations; The Bold and the Beautiful came in second with 23.

Awards
Winners are listed first, highlighted in boldface, and indicated with a double dagger.

Lifetime Achievement Award

 Mary Hart, former long-running host of Entertainment Tonight

Presenters and performances

The following individuals presented awards or performed musical acts.

Presenters (in order of appearance)

Performers

References

044
Daytime Emmy Awards
Daytime Emmys